The Reverend Doctor David Haxton Carswell Read, B.D. D.D. (2 January 1910 – 7 January 2001) was a Scottish Presbyterian clergyman and author who served as Senior Minister at the Madison Avenue Presbyterian Church in New York City, New York from 1956–1989.  He also served as the first Chaplain of the University of Edinburgh from 1949 to 1955 and as "Chaplain to Her Majesty the Queen in Scotland" from 1952–1956.

Read was also taken prisoner by the Germans while serving as Chaplain to the 51st Highland Division of the British Army during World War II.  He gained significant recognition for his book, published 1944, entitled Prisoners' Quest, about his experiences in the German POW camps.

Books by David H. C. Read 
Prisoners' quest : a presentation of the Christian faith in a prisoners of war camp, 1944
The Christian Faith, 1956
I am Persuaded, 1961
Sons of Anak: The Gospel and the Modern Giants, 1964
The Pattern of Christ, 1967
Christian Ethics, 1968
Religion without Wrappings, 1970
Overheard, 1971
Curious Christians, 1973
Expanding Faith, 1973
Sent from God: The Enduring Power and Mystery of Preaching, 1974
Go & Make Disciples, 1978
Unfinished Easter: Sermons on the Ministry, 1978
The Faith Is Still There, 1981
This Grace Given, 1984
Grace Thus Far, 1986
God Was in the Laughter: The Autobiography of David Haxton Carswell Read, 2005
Virginia Wolf Meets Charlie Brown, 1968
Good News in the Letters of Paul, 1975
Preaching About the Needs of Real People, 1988
The Presence of Christ, 1968
Faith Without Fanaticism: What Churches Have to Offer 1987
Whose God is Dead, 1966
Holy Common Sense, 1966
Christmas Tales for All Ages, 1989
The Communication of the Gospel, 1952
God's Mobile Family, 1966

References

1910 births
2001 deaths
People from Cupar
Scottish military chaplains
World War II chaplains
Royal Army Chaplains' Department officers
British World War II prisoners of war
United Presbyterian Church in the United States of America ministers
British expatriates in the United States
20th-century American clergy